Handango was an online store selling mobile apps for personal digital assistants and smartphones headquartered in Irving, Texas.

History 

Handango InHand was founded in 1999 by Randy Eisenman. It is an app store for finding, installing, and buying software for mobile devices. It was made available in 2003 for Symbian UIQ users, 2004 for Windows Mobile and Palm OS, 2005 for Blackberry, and 2006 for Symbian S60.

Application downloads and purchases are completed directly on the device. Descriptions, ratings and screenshots are available for all applications.

In 2010, PocketGear announced its acquisition of Handango. In 2011, PocketGear rebranded the company as Appia. Appia shifted focus to on-device OEM branded store apps, shifting its model to become a white-label app marketplace platform. Consequently, both Handango's and PocketGear's websites were shut down in 2013.

See also 
 List of digital distribution platforms for mobile devices
 Amazon Appstore
 App Store (iOS/iPadOS)
 BlackBerry World

References

External links
 Official website

Personal digital assistant software
Pocket PC software
Symbian software
Windows Mobile Standard software
Mobile software distribution platforms